Stibadocerodes is a genus of crane fly in the family Cylindrotomidae.

Biology
The larvae of the genus Stibadocerodes live on mosses. Adults are to be found in damp wooded habitats.

Distribution
Australia.

Species
S. australiensis (Alexander, 1922)
S. tasmaniensis (Alexander, 1922)
S. zherikhini Krzeminski, 2001

References

Cylindrotomidae
Diptera of Australasia